Papyrus 26 (in the Gregory-Aland numbering), designated by 𝔓26, is an early copy of the New Testament in Greek. It is a papyrus manuscript of the Epistle to the Romans, it contains only Romans 1:1-16. The manuscript paleographically has been assigned to the late 6th or early 7th century.

The Greek text of this codex is a representative of the Alexandrian text-type. Aland placed it in Category I.

It is currently housed at the Southern Methodist University in Dallas, Texas.

See also 

 List of New Testament papyri

References

Further reading 

 B. P. Grenfell & A. S. Hunt, Oxyrynchus Papyri XI, (London 1915), pp. 6–9.

External links 

 Advanced Papyrological Information System, UM
 Image of P26 at the Center for the Study of New Testament Manuscripts

New Testament papyri
6th-century biblical manuscripts
Epistle to the Romans papyri